Kenneth Oliver Hale (18 September 1939 – 5 January 2015) was an English football player and manager. He played as an inside forward for Newcastle United, Coventry City, Oxford United, Darlington and Halifax Town, and scored 84 goals from 420 appearances in the Football League. He had a brief spell as player-manager of Darlington in 1972, and went on to manage Hartlepool from 1974 to 1976.

Managerial statistics
Source:

References

1939 births
2015 deaths
People from Blyth, Northumberland
English footballers
Association football inside forwards
Newcastle United F.C. players
Coventry City F.C. players
Oxford United F.C. players
Darlington F.C. players
Halifax Town A.F.C. players
English Football League players
English football managers
Darlington F.C. managers
Hartlepool United F.C. managers
English Football League managers
Footballers from Northumberland